Streetcar Society is a TECO Line station located in Ybor City, Florida. There is one side platform and one track on the northwest corner of 15th Street and 8th Avenue. The track and platform is situated on a concrete slab on the north side of 8th Avenue. The station is one block west of Centro Ybor station.

See also

Light rail in the United States
List of streetcar systems in the United States
Streetcars in North America
Transportation in Florida

References

External links
 Official Website
 Station from Google Maps Street View

Railway stations in the United States opened in 2002
TECO Line Streetcar System stations
2002 establishments in Florida